Robert Wright Stopford,  (20 February 1901 – 13 August 1976) was a British Anglican bishop.

Early life and education
Stopford was born in Garston, Merseyside (then in Lancashire), and educated at Coatham School in Redcar and Liverpool College, where he was Head of House (Littler's). He continued his education at Hertford College, Oxford, where he graduated with a Master of Arts degree. At Oxford he obtained first classes in classical honour moderations (1922) and modern history (1924). He was subsequently an Honorary Fellow of Hertford College, Oxford, and a Fellow of King's College London. He received a Doctor of Divinity degree from the University of London and a Doctor of Civil Law degree from the University of Durham. Stopford was married with two children.

Ministry
Michaelmas 1932 made deacon
Michaelmas 1933 ordained priest
1932–1935 Chaplain, Oundle School
1935–1940 Principal of Trinity College (Kandy), Ceylon
1940–1946 Principal of Achimota College, Gold Coast
1946–1947 Rector of Chipping Barnet
1947–1955 Moderator—Secretary, Council of the Church Training Colleges
1952–1955 Honorary Chaplain to the Queen; General Secretary, the National Society; Secretary, the Schools Council
11 June 1955 consecrated bishop
1955–1956 Bishop suffragan of Fulham (jurisdiction: northern Europe)
June 1956-1961 Bishop of Peterborough
1961–1973 Bishop of London (confirmed 25 September 1961; retired June 1973)
1961–1976 Privy Counsellor
 17th October 1961-1973 Dean of Her Majesty's Chapels Royal.
1974–76 Vicar-General in Jerusalem
1975 Chairman of the D'Oyly Carte Opera Trust
8 February 1976: installed Bishop of Bermuda at Hamilton Cathedral

During his tenure as Bishop of London, Stopford formalised the system of assigning districts to the oversight of suffragans, adapted the diocese's organisation to the 1964 creation of Greater London, and initiated the 1970 experimental area scheme.

Legacy

Bishop Stopford's School in Enfield and Bishop Stopford School in Kettering are named after him. A boarding house, Stopford House, at Achimota School in Accra, Ghana, was named in his honour. He was appointed KCVO in 1973, shortly before he retired as Bishop of London

See also
Faik Haddad

References

External links
Trinity College, Sri Lanka
Bishop Stopford's School at Enfield
Bishop Stopford School in Kettering
The Achimota Trust

1901 births
1976 deaths
Alumni of Hertford College, Oxford
Fellows of King's College London
Bishops of Fulham
20th-century Anglican bishops of Gibraltar
Bishops of Peterborough
Bishops of London
Deans of the Chapel Royal
20th-century Anglican bishops in the Middle East
Commanders of the Order of the British Empire
Members of the Privy Council of the United Kingdom
People educated at Liverpool College
Knights Commander of the Royal Victorian Order
Anglican bishops of Jerusalem
20th-century Anglican bishops in Bermuda
Anglican bishops of Bermuda
Heads of schools in Ghana
Honorary Chaplains to the Queen
Clergy from Liverpool
People educated at Coatham School